Thémistocle (Themistocles) is an opera by the French composer François-André Danican Philidor, first performed at Fontainebleau on 13 October 1785.  It transferred to the Académie Royale de Musique, Paris (the Paris Opera) on 23 May 1786. It takes the form of a tragédie lyrique in three acts. The libretto, by Étienne Morel de Chédeville, is based on the life of the ancient Greek statesman Themistocles.

See also
Philidor's other works:  Blaise le savetier (1759), Le maréchal ferrant (1761), Tom Jones (1765), Ernelinde (1767), Persée (1780)

Sources
 Félix Clément and Pierre Larousse Dictionnaire des Opéras, p.658

External links
  Original edition of the score at Gallica BNF

Operas by François-André Danican Philidor
Tragédies en musique
French-language operas
1785 operas
Operas